Gladstone is a suburb of New Zealand's southernmost city, Invercargill.

The area is low-lying and at risk from flooding and sea level rise.

History

The suburb was targeted during a six week burglary spree in December 2019 and January 2020.

In July 2020, a member of the public was injured during the aggravated robbery of a Gladstone convenience store. Two men were charged over the incident the following month.

In September 2020, the Southland Times reported high demand for land and housing in Gladstone. However, in November 2020, Quotable Values released statistics showing house values were increasing at a slower rate than the rest of Invercargill.

Demographics

Gladstone had a population of 2,376 at the 2018 New Zealand census, a decrease of 9 people (−0.4%) since the 2013 census, and a decrease of 108 people (−4.3%) since the 2006 census. There were 942 households. There were 1,152 males and 1,224 females, giving a sex ratio of 0.94 males per female. The median age was 44.4 years (compared with 37.4 years nationally), with 420 people (17.7%) aged under 15 years, 414 (17.4%) aged 15 to 29, 1,200 (50.5%) aged 30 to 64, and 339 (14.3%) aged 65 or older.

Ethnicities were 89.0% European/Pākehā, 9.8% Māori, 1.8% Pacific peoples, 6.1% Asian, and 2.0% other ethnicities (totals add to more than 100% since people could identify with multiple ethnicities).

The proportion of people born overseas was 15.3%, compared with 27.1% nationally.

Although some people objected to giving their religion, 46.3% had no religion, 44.2% were Christian, 0.5% were Hindu, 0.3% were Muslim, 0.9% were Buddhist and 1.3% had other religions.

Of those at least 15 years old, 543 (27.8%) people had a bachelor or higher degree, and 291 (14.9%) people had no formal qualifications. The median income was $39,900, compared with $31,800 nationally. 483 people (24.7%) earned over $70,000 compared to 17.2% nationally. The employment status of those at least 15 was that 1,080 (55.2%) people were employed full-time, 357 (18.3%) were part-time, and 54 (2.8%) were unemployed.

Education
Southland Boys' High School is a single-sex state secondary school for years 7 to 13 with a roll of  students as of  The school first opened in 1881 and moved to its current site in 1926.

Waihopai School is a state primary school for years 1 to 6 with a roll of  students. The school opened in 1914 as Queen's Park School and adopted its current name one year later. It was formed by the merger of Invercargill Park School and Gladstone (Waihopai) School.

References

Suburbs of Invercargill